Jennifer Quesada (born 22 February 1992 in Loíza, Puerto Rico) is a Puerto Rican volleyball player.
She plays as a center for the Orientales de Humacao. She played for the Puerto Rico women's national volleyball team.
She participated in the 2012 FIVB World Grand Prix, 2013 FIVB World Grand Prix, 2017 FIVB World Grand Prix.
She won the bronze medal at the 2017 Women's Pan-American Volleyball Cup.

Career 
Jennifer Quesada's career began in the 2010 season, when she played for the Mets de Guaynabo in the Liga de Voleibol Superior Femenino. In the following three championships he played for Vaqueras de Bayamón. She played in the 2014 championship for Criollas de Caguas.

In the 2015 championship she played for the Changas de Naranjito.
In 2016 she was traded to the Orientales de Humacao.

References

External links 
 player info FIVB
 player info FIVB
 http://m.guardian.co.tt/archives/sports/other-sports/2010/07/07/puerto-rico-whips-tt-junior-vball-women
 https://www.elnuevodia.com/deportes/voleibol/nota/llegoelcambiogeneracionalenelvoleibolfemenino-2310462/
 http://www.norceca.net/2017%20Events/XVI%20Womens_PanAm%20Cup_%20PERU/XVI%20Womens%20Panamerican%20Cup%202017.htm
 http://www.primerahora.com/horizonte/deportes/voleibol/nota/destinadaalamallaaltajenniferquesada-1206416/

1992 births
Living people
Puerto Rican women's volleyball players
People from Loíza, Puerto Rico
Middle blockers